Maidens railway station was a railway station serving the village of Maidens, South Ayrshire, Scotland. The station was part of the Maidens and Dunure Light Railway.

History
The station opened on 17 May 1906. It closed on 1 December 1930, but reopened briefly between 4 July 1932 and 1 June 1933.

The station had a single island platform with a small wooden building with overhanging canopies. The former station site is located next to the A719, a short distance east of the village of the same name, however the site is now a caravan park leaving no remaining trace of the station.

References

Notes

Sources
 
 
 
 Article in British Railway Journal No 8 Summer 1985 Wild Swan Publications

Disused railway stations in South Ayrshire
Railway stations in Great Britain opened in 1906
Railway stations in Great Britain closed in 1930
Railway stations in Great Britain opened in 1932
Railway stations in Great Britain closed in 1933
Former Glasgow and South Western Railway stations